LightBike is an iOS snake game inspired by the movie Tron. It was developed by Japanese studio Pankaku and released on January 29, 2009. It was followed by LightBike 2.
The full version of Lightbike unlocks full-time for Network Mode and local multiplayer.

Gameplay 
Lightbike plays just like the Tron movies demonstrate it. The player is in a bike that shoots out a wall from behind, which is used to be guided in order to defeat the enemies. The game can be played with other people over the Internet. This is limited in the free version of the game.

Reception
MacWorld gave LightBike a rating of 4/5 stars, writing "Pankaku has done a great job with LightBike and for £1.79 on the App Store, there's no better way to kill 10 minutes. (Note that a free lite version is available, though only with a single-player mode.) With room to grow, it'll be interesting to see what happens in the next few updates and what the company chooses to add. " SlideToPlay gave the game a rating of 2 out of 4, concluding "LightBike doesn't do enough to keep you interested over the long term."

Legacy
LightBike 2 is the second installment of its following game which provides more features to the table, Including more customization, power ups, maps, a tournament, and servers made by other players as of its release until 2017.

148Apps gave LightBike 2 3.5/5 stars, writing "While Light Bike 2 does a good job of mimicking a TRON light cycle battle, it doesn't build a strong enough game around that experience to encourage prolonged play. Network issues also plague the game." KnowyourMobile wrote "After that, all we can hope is that Disney's lawyers don't come down on LightBike 2 once Tron: Legacy is ready for release on the iPhone, but if we were the developer we wouldn't be holding our breath. This game isn't likely to survive the movie marketing, so if it sounds appealing, don't dally". MacLife listed the game in an article entitled The 7 Best TRON Games for iOS and Mac, commenting "LightBike 2's instructions, settings, and eye candy are minimal, but what really makes the game glow is its choice of arenas. Okay, there are only two choices: one is a standard grid, but the second features multiple grids at different heights, allowing for jumps to lower platforms and desperate escapes up ramps. It's completely baffling for human and AI opponents alike, and dizzying fun for Tron fans."

External links 
 Official website for LightBike
 Official website for LightBike 2 (archived)
 Official website for LightBike Runner

References

2009 video games
Android (operating system) games
IOS games
Snake video games
Video games developed in Japan